29 Squadron or 29th Squadron may refer to:

 No. 29 Squadron RAAF, a unit of the Australian Royal Air Force
 No. 29 Squadron RAF, a unit of the United Kingdom Royal Air Force
 29 Squadron SAAF, a unit of the South African Air Force during the Second World War.
 Marine Aviation Logistics Squadron 29, a unit of the United States Marine Corps